The TIM-100 was a PTT teller microcomputer developed by Mihajlo Pupin Institute (Serbia) in 1985 (Ref.lit. #1). It was based on the Intel microprocessors types 80x86 and VLSI circuitry. RAM had capacity max.8MB, and the external memory were  floppy disks of 5.25 or 3.50 inch. (Ref.literature #2, #3 and #4).
Multiuser, multitasking  Operating system was  real-time NRT  and also TRANOS (developed by PTT office).

See also
 Mihajlo Pupin Institute
 History of computer hardware in the SFRY
 Microcomputers

References

1. D.Milicevic, D.Starcevic, D.Hristovic: "Architecture and Applications of the TIM Computers", Primenjena nauka journal, No 14, pp. 23–30, Belgrade May 1988. (in Serbian)
2. Dragoljub Milicevic, Dusan Hristovic(Ed): RACUNARI TIM (TIM Computers), Naucna Knjiga,Belgrade 1990.
3. Computing Technology in Serbia, by Dusan Hristovic, Phlogiston, No 18/19, pp. 89–105, Museum MNT-SANU, Belgrade 2010/2011. (in Serbian)
4. 50 Years of Computing in Serbia- Hronika digitalnih decenija, by D.B.Vujaklija, N. Markovic-Ed, pp. 37–44 and 75–86 in this book, PC Press, Belgrade 2011.  (in Serbian).

Fig.4. TIM designers from M.P.Institute-Belgrade, Wikimedia

Mihajlo Pupin Institute
IBM PC compatibles
Computing by computer model